Snowbank Lake may refer to:
Snowbank Lake (Idaho) in Elmore County
Snowbank Lake (Minnesota) in Lake County
Snowbank Lake (Lewis and Clark County, Montana), a lake in Lewis and Clark County, Montana